Kainotropite is a rare vanadate mineral with the formula Cu4FeO2(V2O7)(VO4). It contains trivalent iron. It is one of many fumarolic minerals discovered on the Tolbachik volcano. The name of its parental fumarole is "Yadovitaya", which means poisonous.

Relation to other minerals
Structure of kainotropite is unique. However, there are other minerals containing both copper and divanadate group, like engelhauptite and volborthite.

External links
 Kainotropite on Mindat:

References

Vanadate minerals
Copper(II) minerals
Iron(III) minerals
Orthorhombic minerals
Minerals in space group 62